Millard North High School is a high school in Omaha, Nebraska, United States. It is part of the Millard Public Schools district. Millard North partially opened in 1978 for 9th and 10th grade students. In 1981, the second phase of the project was completed and the school began to serve students in grades 9-12; at that time, the school's name was changed to Millard North High School.  The school completed an expansion in 2007. Millard North underwent a comprehensive renovation which was finished in 2016.

Curriculum

International Baccalaureate

Millard North is one of three public high schools in Nebraska to carry the International Baccalaureate Diploma Programme, and was the first in the state to offer it. Along with Millard North Middle School, Millard North High School offers the IB Middle Years Programme. The only other schools in Nebraska that offer the Diploma Programme are Lincoln High School in Lincoln and Omaha Central High School in Omaha.

Academies

Millard North is part of the Millard Public Schools System, which offers the Academy program for those students aspiring to a particular career after graduation. Currently, Millard North is home to the Business & Logistics Management Academy. Millard North sends students to the other three Millard high schools to participate in the other academies. Currently, there are five academies offered in the Millard district: Education at Millard West; Entrepreneurship at Millard South; Health Sciences at Horizon; and STEM at Millard West. Academy students graduate with almost a full year of college credit (though this varies by academy) and partake in the program during the junior and senior years of high school.

Extracurricular activities

State championships

Journalism
Millard North has two official student publications. The Hoofbeat, the newspaper, is published every three weeks and maintains an online website. The publication received the Cornhusker Award in 2011, 2015, 2016 and 2020.  The Stampede, the school yearbook, is published in May with a supplement published in August. The Millard North journalism program won first place overall in the 2011 and 2022 Nebraska state competitions and were co-State Champions in 2012.

Nebraska Economics Challenge
Millard North operates an economics program, associated with the Advanced Placement Program, to compete in the Nebraska Economics Challenge.  Millard North won four straight championships from 2011-2012 to 2014-2015.

National Personal Finance Challenge
The National Personal Finance Challenge (NPFC) is a nationwide competition that provides high school students the opportunity to build and demonstrate their knowledge of money management. Teams showcase their expertise in the concepts of earning income, buying goods and services, saving, using credit, investing, and protecting. In 2021, the champion team was from Millard North.

Notable alumni
 Keith Ballard, retired NHL defenseman
Lance Cade, professional wrestler
 Eric Crouch, football player, 2001 Heisman Trophy winner
 Nick DeLuca, Professional Football player
 Conor Gillaspie, baseball player, third baseman for the San Francisco Giants
 Ryan Malone, National Hockey League forward
 Erin McCarthy, professional ten-pin bowler, 2022 U.S. Women's Open champion
 Seth Olsen, football player, offensive lineman who has played for the Denver Broncos and Minnesota Vikings
 Paul Stastny, hockey player, center for the Winnipeg Jets
 Jeff Tarpinian, football player, linebacker for the Houston Texans
 Patrick Tyrance, professional football player, Los Angeles Rams
 Michael Zagurski, Major League Baseball pitcher
 Kelly Lindsey, defender, USA Women's National Soccer Team, Women's United Soccer Association
 Drew Dober, UFC fighter
 Hunter Sallis, basketball player, Gonzaga Bulldogs

References

External links
 The Hoofbeat online publication
 Millard North High School official website
 Millard North alumni website

Public high schools in Nebraska
Educational institutions established in 1981
1981 establishments in Nebraska
International Baccalaureate schools in Nebraska
High schools in Omaha, Nebraska
Millard Public Schools